The Mulkirigala Polling Division is a Polling Division in the Hambantota Electoral District, in the Southern Province, Sri Lanka.

Presidential Election Results

Summary
The winner of Mulkirigala has matched the final country result 6 out of 8 times. Hence, Mulkirigala is a Weak Bellwether for Presidential Elections.

2019 Sri Lankan Presidential Election

2015 Sri Lankan Presidential Election

2010 Sri Lankan Presidential Election

2005 Sri Lankan Presidential Election

1999 Sri Lankan Presidential Election

1994 Sri Lankan Presidential Election

1988 Sri Lankan Presidential Election

1982 Sri Lankan Presidential Election

Parliamentary Election Results

Summary 

The winner of Mulkirigala has matched the final country result 5 out of 7 times. Hence, Mulkirigala is a Weak Bellwether for Parliamentary Elections.

2015 Sri Lankan Parliamentary Election

2010 Sri Lankan Parliamentary Election

2004 Sri Lankan Parliamentary Election

2001 Sri Lankan Parliamentary Election

2000 Sri Lankan Parliamentary Election

1994 Sri Lankan Parliamentary Election

1989 Sri Lankan Parliamentary Election

Demographics

Ethnicity
The Mulkirigala Polling Division has a Sinhalese majority (99.3%) . In comparison, the Hambantota Electoral District (which contains the Mulkirigala Polling Division) has a Sinhalese majority (97.1%)

Religion
The Mulkirigala Polling Division has a Buddhist majority (99.2%) . In comparison, the Hambantota Electoral District (which contains the Mulkirigala Polling Division) has a Buddhist majority (96.7%)

References

Polling Divisions of Sri Lanka
Polling Divisions of the Hambantota Electoral District